, also known as Lito, is a Japanese actor and singer. He is best known for his role as Senichi "Sen-chan" Enari/Deka Green in the 2004 TV series Tokusou Sentai Dekaranger. Itou is affiliated with Actoli Llc.

Filmography

TV dramas
 Tokusou Sentai Dekaranger (2004–2005) – Senichi Enari/Deka Green
 Tensou Sentai Goseiger Epic 10 (2010) – Magis/Gosei Green
 Zyuden Sentai Kyoryuger Brave 27 (2013) – Debo Shi nobi nba (Voice) (ep. 27)
 Uchu Sentai Kyuranger Space 18 (2017) – Senichi Enari

Films
 Tokusou Sentai Dekaranger The Movie: Full Blast Action (2004) – Senichi Enari/Deka Green
 Kashima-C (2006) – Takebe
 The Setting Sun (2009) – Naoji
 Gangsta (2011) – Shirosasori
 Bolero (2012)
 Shinrei Shashinbu Gekijōban (2014) – Kaname Makimura

Direct-to-video
 Tokusou Sentai Dekaranger Super Video: Super Finisher Match! Deka Red vs. Deka Break (2004) – Senichi Enari/Deka Green
 Tokusou Sentai Dekaranger vs. Abaranger (2005) – Senichi Enari/Deka Green
 Mahou Sentai Magiranger vs. Dekaranger (2006) – Senichi Enari/Deka Green
 Shinrei Shashinbu (2010) – Kaname Makimura
 Tokusou Sentai Dekaranger: 10 Years after (2015) – Senichi Enari/Deka Green
 Space Squad: Gavan vs. Dekaranger (2017) – Senichi Enari/Deka Green

Web dramas
 From Episode of Stinger: Uchu Sentai Kyuranger: High School Wars (2017) – Kouchou Indaver (Voice) and Seitokaichou Indaver (Voice)

Dubbing
 Power Rangers S.P.D. (2011) – Bridge Carson/SPD Green Ranger
 Power Rangers Mystic Force (2012) – Matoombo

Anime
 Shirokuma Cafe (2012–2013) – Tapir, Mandrill, Father, Customer, Maruyama, and Brazilian Porcupine
 Yu-Gi-Oh! Zexal II (2012) – Chitaro Ariga
 When Marnie Was There (2014)
 Aragne no Mushikago (2018) – Tokiyo

Musicals and stageplays
 Rock Musical Bleach (2005) – Kisuke Urahara
 Rock Musical Bleach Saien (2006) – Kisuke Urahara
 Bambino (2006) – Ryuta
 Bambino+ (2006) – Ryuta
 Bambino.2 (2007) – Ryuta
 Bambino+ in Yokohama (2007) – Ryuta
 Bambino.0 (2008) – Ryuta
 Bambino+ in Apple ~Shige Last Live!!~ (2008) – Ryuta
 Hiiro no Kakera (2008) – Takuma Onizaki
 Bambino.3&+ (2009) – Ryuta

Other work
 Digimon Savers (Ending theme performance)

Discography

Singles

References

External links 
  
 Yousuke Ito's Blog 

1984 births
Living people

Male voice actors from Sapporo
Japanese male film actors
Japanese male stage actors
Japanese male television actors
Japanese male voice actors
Musicians from Sapporo